David John Farmbrough (4 May 1929 – 9 March 2013) was Bishop of Bedford from 1981 to 1993.

Farmbrough was educated at Bedford School and Lincoln College, Oxford before embarking on an ecclesiastical career with a curacy at Bishop's Hatfield, after which he was priest in charge of St John's Church in the same parish.

Following this he was Vicar of Bishop's Stortford. Later he became Rural Dean of the area and then (his final appointment before ordination to the episcopate) Archdeacon of St Albans (1974–1981). In retirement he served the Diocese of St Albans as an assistant bishop.

References

1929 births
2013 deaths
People educated at Bedford School
Alumni of Lincoln College, Oxford
Archdeacons of St Albans
Bishops of Bedford
20th-century Church of England bishops